Carisbrooke College is a foundation trust-supported secondary school in Carisbrooke on the Isle of Wight, formerly Carisbrooke High School. Sixth form students are based at the Island Innovation sixth form Campus, in Newport, a shared sixth form with Medina College.

History
The history of Carisbrooke College dates from 1907, when its forerunner, Newport County Secondary Grammar School, was opened on Upper St James Street, Newport. The new school was situated on the site of the pre-existing Newport Technical Institute and Seely Library, both having been built with the support of Sir Charles Seely.

In 1957–58, the school moved from its premises on St James Street, Newport, to a purpose-built site in nearby Carisbrooke. The school changed its name to Carisbrooke Grammar School. It also absorbed many of the students from the East Cowes Technical School, which closed down a year or so later. On the same site a separate school was built, called Priory Boys Secondary Modern School. The schools shared sports fields for football, rugby, cricket, hockey and athletics plus a kitchen and dining room block.

The Carisbrooke Grammar School complex included a main block with classrooms, a staff room, staff offices, senior common room and a tuck shop. Connected to this block were a music room and assembly hall/auditorium and a  gymnasium .  There was a separate science block. A single-storey craft block was included for woodwork and metalwork classes. A few years after opening, an outdoor swimming pool was added. There were separate playgrounds for boys and girls, each with tennis courts for use in the summer.

The first headmaster of Carisbrooke Grammar School was Stanley G. Ward, with an initial staff complement of 41. Each of Forms 1 through 5 initially had four classes designated 1A, 1B, 1C, 1D, 2A and so on. This was changed in 1960 when Forms 3 through 5 classes C and D were relabeled L and G, for Latin and German. Each year had approximately 120 students. By 1965 the Lower and Upper Sixth Forms had about 60 students.

The Isle of Wight moved to a comprehensive education system in 1971. This resulted in Carisbrooke Grammar School merging with its neighbour, Priory Boys Secondary Modern School, to become Carisbrooke High School.

The Isle of Wight reorganised its education system again in 2010–11. As a result, Island Innovation Trust (formerly Medina Innovation Trust), took over responsibility for the school. In September 2011, the school reopened as Carisbrooke College, with the age range extended to Year 7 to Year 13 (having previously been from Year 9 upwards). It is now one of eight secondary providers on the Isle of Wight, with the school in a hard federation with Medina College.

In July 2015 Isle of Wight Council put forward proposals to close Carisbrooke College from 2016, and merge it with Medina College. The plan was rejected by councillors.

 Over 2017-2020 the sprawling old buildings were progressively demolished, and a new building was erected on a much smaller footprint.

Facilities

 
The main school site is situated on the outskirts of Carisbrooke village and occupies an area of 24 acres. The school shares a 6th form campus with Medina College on Upper St James Street, Newport, on the former Nodehill Middle School site (the same site where the school began life in 1907 as Newport County Secondary Grammar School).

The school has extensive sports facilities, including several rugby pitches, football and hockey pitches, a flood-lit astroturf pitch, basketball courts, squash courts, tennis courts, netball courts, two fitness suites, an indoor sports hall, and a gymnasium. Other facilities at the school include two halls (the 'Main Hall' and the 'West Hall'), a large drama studio, ten science laboratories, extensive facilities for art and design technology, and a cafeteria.

Results
The school's recent exam results are listed below:

Notable former pupils
Arts and media
 Suri Krishnamma, film director
 Donna Langley, Chair of Universal Pictures

Sport
Danny Briggs, England cricketer
Keegan Brown, professional darts player
Tom Friend, cricketer
 Adam Hose, MCC cricketer
Darren Mew, Olympic swimmer
Gareth Williams, former Aston Villa footballer

External links
School website

References

Secondary schools on the Isle of Wight
Foundation schools on the Isle of Wight
1907 establishments in England
Educational institutions established in 1907